Alan Redfield (born c. 1953) is an American politician. He is a member of the Montana House of Representatives from the 59th District, serving since 2013. He is a member of the Republican party.

Awards 
 2019 Friend of Farm Bureau Award. Presented by Montana Farm Bureau Federation.

Personal life 
Redfield's wife is Laurie Redfield. They have two children. Redfield and his family live in Livingston, Montana.

External links 
 Rep. Alan Redfield at leg.mt.gov
 Alan Redfield at ballotpedia.org

References

Living people
1950s births
Republican Party members of the Montana House of Representatives
Place of birth missing (living people)
21st-century American politicians